Hyacinthoides hispanica (syn. Endymion hispanicus or Scilla hispanica), the Spanish bluebell, is a spring-flowering bulbous perennial native to the Iberian Peninsula. It is one of around a dozen species in the genus Hyacinthoides, others including the common bluebell (Hyacinthoides non-scripta) in northwestern Europe, and the Italian bluebell (Hyacinthoides italica) further east in the Mediterranean region.

Description
It is distinguished from the common bluebell by its paler and larger blue flowers, which are less pendulous and not all drooping to one side like the common bluebell; plus a more erect flower stem (raceme), broader leaves, blue anthers (where the common bluebell has creamy-white ones) and little or no scent compared to the strong fragrant scent of the northern species. Like Hyacinthoides non-scripta, both pink- and white-flowered forms occur.

Distribution
Hyacinthoides hispanica is native to the western part of the Iberian Peninsula (except the extreme northwest) which includes Portugal and western Spain, but has naturalized and is cultivated in many other European countries, North America and Australia.

The Spanish bluebell was introduced in the United Kingdom. Since then, it has hybridised frequently with the native common bluebell and the resulting hybrids are regarded as invasive. The resulting hybrid Hyacinthoides × massartiana and the Spanish bluebell both produce highly fertile seed but it is generally the hybrid that invades areas of the native common bluebell. This has caused the common bluebell to be viewed as a threatened species.

The Spanish bluebell is also cultivated as a garden plant, and several named cultivars exist with flowers in various shades of white, pink and blue.

References

General
The-Tree.org:  Bluebell (includes key to identification of hybrids)
Huxley, A. (1992). New RHS Dictionary of Gardening vol. 2: 604. Macmillan.

External links

hispanica
Endemic flora of the Iberian Peninsula
Ephemeral plants
Plants described in 1768